Ai Xinliang (born 19 May 1997) is a Chinese Paralympic archer. He won the gold medal in the team compound open event at the 2016 Summer Paralympics held in Rio de Janeiro, Brazil. In 2021, he won the bronze medal in the men's individual compound open event at the 2020 Summer Paralympics held in Tokyo, Japan.

References 

Living people
1997 births
Chinese male archers
Paralympic archers of China
Paralympic gold medalists for China
Paralympic bronze medalists for China
Paralympic medalists in archery
Archers at the 2016 Summer Paralympics
Archers at the 2020 Summer Paralympics
Medalists at the 2016 Summer Paralympics
Medalists at the 2020 Summer Paralympics
Place of birth missing (living people)
21st-century Chinese people